Alice of Champagne (1193 – 1246) was the queen consort of Cyprus from 1210 to 1218, regent of Cyprus from 1218 to 1223, and of Jerusalem from 1243 to 1246. She was the eldest daughter of Queen Isabella I of Jerusalem and Count Henry II of Champagne. In 1210, Alice married her step-brother King Hugh I of Cyprus, receiving the County of Jaffa as dowry. After her husband's death in 1218, she assumed the regency for their infant son, King Henry I. In time, she began seeking contacts within her father's counties in France to bolster her claim to Champagne and Brie against her cousin, Theobald IV. However, the kings of France never acknowledged her claim.

After a dispute with Philip of Ibelin, bailli of Cyprus in 1223, she left the island. She married Bohemond, heir apparent to the Principality of Antioch and the County of Tripoli, but their marriage was annulled because of kinship. She laid claim to the Kingdom of Jerusalem against the infant Conrad (the son of her niece Queen Isabella II of Jerusalem and the Holy Roman Emperor, Frederick II) who was absent from the kingdom in 1229, but the High Court of Jerusalem rejected her claim. When her son reached the age of majority in 1232, Alice abdicated her regency and departed for France to claim Champagne and Brie. She subsequently renounced her claim and returned to the Holy Land.

In 1240, she married Raoul of Nesle who was about half of her age at the time. The High Court of Jerusalem proclaimed Alice and her husband regents for Conrad in 1243, but their power was only nominal. Raoul of Nesle left the kingdom, and Alice, before the end of the year. Alice retained the regency until her death in 1246.

Childhood 
Alice, born around 1193, was the eldest daughter of Queen Isabella I of Jerusalem and her third husband, Count Henry II of Champagne.  Her father and the lord of Cyprus, Aimery of Lusignan, had agreed that Aimery's eldest surviving son was to marry Henry's eldest surviving daughter, stipulating that she would receive the County of Jaffa as dowry. Henry died in Acre on 10 September 1197 when he fell from a tower in his palace. A month after his death, his widow (Alice's mother) married Aimery, who had recently been crowned king of Cyprus.

Before his departure for the Holy Land, Henry had bequeathed the counties of Champagne and Brie to his brother, Theobald, should he die without issue. Although Alice and her younger sister Philippa survived their father, King Philip II of France invested their uncle, Theobald III, with Champagne and Brie in January 1198. Theobald III died on 24 May 1201, leaving Champagne and Brie to his posthumous son, Theobald IV, under the regency of Blanche of Navarre, who was Theobald III's widow and Theobald IV's mother. Theobald IV's position was not secure because Alice and Philippa, both born while their father was count, could challenge a posthumous son's right to rule the counties.

King Aimery died on 1 April 1205 and was soon followed by Alice's mother, Queen Isabella. Maria, Isabella's fourteen-year-old daughter with her second husband, Conrad of Montferrat, ascended the throne while Isabella's half-brother, John of Ibelin, became regent of the kingdom. As the new queen's eldest half-sister, Alice became heir presumptive. She was placed under the guardianship of her maternal grandmother, the dowager queen Maria Komnene.

Cyprus

Queen consort 

Maria Komnene conducted the negotiations for the marriage of Alice to King Hugh I of Cyprus, Aimery of Lusignan's eldest surviving son and successor, in accordance with the agreement their fathers had reached. Since the marriage of Alice's mother and Hugh I's father made them stepsiblings, a special dispensation was needed. This was granted by Pope Innocent III. Blanche supplied her niece's dowry to ensure that she would stay in Cyprus rather than attempt to lay claim to Champagne and Brie. To strengthen her son's position, Blanche also persuaded Philip II of France in 1209 to promise that he would not allow anyone to challenge Theobald IV's right to the two counties before Theobald reached the age of majority.

Alice and Hugh I married in the first half of 1210, with Alice receiving the County of Jaffa as the agreed upon dowry. They had two daughters, Maria and Isabella, and a son, Henry. Alice's sister, Philippa, married Erard of Ramerupt, who laid claim to Champagne and Brie on Philippa's behalf in 1213. Blanche soon approached the Holy See to demand an investigation into the validity of the second and third marriage of Alice's and Philippa's mother, stating that her first marriage to Humphrey IV of Toron had not been canonically annulled. The inquiry conducted by Cardinal Robert of Courçon at the pope's order concluded that both Humphrey IV and Isabella I had protested against the annulment of their marriage, which suggested that Isabella I's two subsequent marriages were unlawful. However, the Holy See did not complete the investigation and thus the legitimacy of Alice and Philippa was not questioned.

Regent 

After Hugh I died in Tripoli on 10 January 1218, Alice assumed the regency for their infant son, Henry I, and installed her uncle Philip of Ibelin as bailli. The administration of the kingdom was, according to the contemporaneous lawyer Philip of Novara, arranged by Hugh I on his deathbed, although Ernoul's chronicle suggests that Alice acted independently. Pope Honorius III instructed his legate, Cardinal Pelagius Galvani, to protect Alice and her children against "certain men inspired with wicked fervour", suggesting that Alice faced some opposition at the beginning of her regency. 

In 1218, Alice's brother-in-law Erard of Ramerupt renounced his wife's claim to Champagne in return for compensation, even promising to support Theobald IV against Alice. This led Alice to send envoys to Champagne, against which her aunt Blanche protested at the Holy See on 23 June 1219.

Negotiations with Pelagius about the status of the Church in the Kingdom of Cyprus concluded with an agreement in October 1220. One of Alice's demands was for Greek Orthodox priests to be exempt from taxation. She also persuaded the pope, who had ordered the abolition of the Orthodox hierarchy on the island, to permit the appointment of Orthodox suffragan bishops in the four Roman Catholic dioceses. In time, the agreement was revised, as the Cypriot noblemen opposed the payment of a tithe (as prescribed by the agreement). The Holy See had also demanded that the estates the nobles had seized from the Orthodox Church be restored to the Catholic clerics. However, this new agreement, reached in 1222, neither freed the noblemen from the tithe nor prescribed the restoration of Church property.

Rumours that Alice would marry William II of Dampierre, constable of Champagne, spread in France in 1223. In August that year, Pope Honorius forbade the marriage, at Theobald IV's behest, emphasizing that Alice and William were closely related. According to the Chronicle of the Holy Land, Alice "spent the revenues of the kingdom liberally", resulting in conflict with Philip of Ibelin. After some debate with the bailli about the tithes payable to the Orthodox clergy, Alice left Cyprus and settled in either Tripoli or Jaffa in 1224. Her children remained on the island.

In exile

Conflicts 

Around late 1224 or early 1225, Alice married Bohemond, heir apparent to the Principality of Antioch and County of Tripoli. Pope Honorius ordered Archbishop Eustorgius of Nicosia to inquire into the legality of the marriage. Alice, who continued to regard herself as regent, wanted to appoint her new husband as bailli, but this appointment was opposed by all Cypriot barons. Alice then offered the office to Aimery Barlais, who was amenable, but the High Court ruled that Alice could not replace Philip of Ibelin who had been made bailli for the duration of her son's minority. Barlais left the island to join Alice, while his supporter Gavin of Chenichy visited with Holy Roman Emperor Frederick II, who had decided to launch a crusade for the Holy Land.

Emperor Frederick II regarded himself as overlord of Cyprus as his father, Emperor Henry VI, had sent the royal crown to Aimery of Lusignan. On Philip of Ibelin's initiative, the High Court arranged the coronation of the eight-year-old Henry without the emperor's consent in 1225, drawing the ire of the emperor. The marriage of Frederick and Queen Isabella II of Jerusalem, daughter and successor of Alice's half-sister Maria, had been decided in 1223. Alice attended the coronation of her niece in Tyre before the queen departed for Italy to meet Frederick in 1225. Frederick persuaded the dying Pope Honorius to delegate two new judges (the Latin patriarch of Jerusalem and the bishop of Acre) to investigate the marriage of Alice and Bohemond, accusing Eustorgius of partiality. Honorius III's decision was confirmed by his successor, Gregory IX. Alice and her husband came to Limassol in summer 1227 to meet Frederick, but a disease prevented Frederick from departing Italy. Pope Gregory declared that Frederick did not fulfill his crusader oath and excommunicated him. Alice and Bohemond's marriage was subsequently annulled.

When Philip of Ibelin died, the High Court appointed his brother, John of Ibelin, as bailli without consulting the emperor or Alice. Frederick departed for Cyprus, landing at Limassol on 21 July 1228. Upon arriving, he ordered John of Ibelin to account for the administration of the revenue of Cyprus during his and his brother's time, but John refused, stating that the revenue had been paid to Alice. Frederick dismissed Ibelin and forced Henry I of Cyprus to swear fealty to him. He also demanded an oath of fealty from the Cypriot noblemen, but they were only willing to submit to him as their king's overlord, declaring that they only owed fealty to Alice who served as regent to their king. Frederick made Aimery Barlais, Gavin of Chenichy, Aimaury of Beisan, Hugh of Gibelet and William of Rivet baillis of Cyprus without Alice's consent before departing for Italy in May 1229. Duke Peter I of Brittany declared that he wanted to marry Alice, but this was refused on 29 May by Pope Gregory because of consanguinity.

Claims 

In autumn 1229, Alice arrived in Acre, whereupon she laid claim to the Kingdom of Jerusalem against the infant Conrad, son and successor of her niece Isabella II and Frederick. She appeared before the High Court of Jerusalem declaring that Conrad had forfeited his right to the kingdom as he had failed to personally take possession of it within a year and a day of the death of his mother, as required by a local law regarding fiefs inherited by a non resident heir. The members of the High Court, who had recently pledged fealty to Conrad's father, rejected Alice's claim, emphasizing that Conrad was a minor. However, they sent their envoys to Frederick in Foggia, Italy, requesting that he send Conrad to the Holy Land within a year and a day. Frederick informed the envoys that he would do what he thought best in May 1230.

When Henry I of Cyprus reached the age of majority on 3 May 1232, Alice abdicated from her regency of Cyprus, which she had retained despite having left Cyprus. She went to France to personally advance her claim for Champagne and Brie in 1233, but only one local nobleman, Renier II of Nogent, supported her. Theobald IV of Champagne later captured the fortress of Nogent and confiscated Renier's estates.

At Theobald's request, Pope Gregory urged Alice to come to Rome, because the legitimacy of her parents' marriage was to be investigated. Alice refused to appear before the papal tribunal, but renounced her claim to Champagne and Brie for 40,000 livres tournois and estates yielding a yearly income of 2,000 livres in September 1234. In the agreement with Theobald, she also stated that she would not erect fortresses in her estates in Champagne.

Alice returned to the Holy Land in 1233. She allegedly renounced the County of Jaffa in favor of her son-in-law, Walter IV of Brienne, who married her daughter, Mary, in the same year, because Walter was styled Count of Jaffa from there on. Alice (who was about 46) married Ralph of Nesle, a man in his twenties who had come to the Holy Land during her cousin Theobald's crusade.

Jerusalem 

In 1242, the citizens of Tyre offered the barons opposed to Frederick's rule (Balian of Ibelin, Lord of Beirut, and Philip of Montfort, Lord of Toron) their assistance against Richard Filangieri, who ruled Tyre on Frederick's behalf. Marsilio Zorzi, the bailli of the Venetian community in the Holy Land offered naval support to the coalition. At the request of the members of the High Court, Philip of Novara, a noted jurist, stated that Frederick had forfeited his right to administer the Kingdom of Jerusalem when his son, Conrad, had reached the age of majority on 25 April 1243. Novara also argued that Alice and her husband were entitled to rule the kingdom as regent for the absent Conrad because she was his closest relative who lived in the Holy Land. The members of the High Court, the representatives of the clergy, the Military Orders and the Italian communities held a joint assembly where Alice and Ralph of Nesle were proclaimed regents on 5 June. She agreed that Balian of Ibelin and Philip of Montfort would keep all royal castles in the kingdom.

Frederick's troops were eventually expelled from Tyre in mid-July. Ralph of Nesle sought to retain control of the town, but was rejected by Ibelin and Montfort. Ibelin and Montfort also refused to transfer Acre to him and Alice, leading to Nesle departing the Holy Land in anger, stating that he was only a "shadow” ruler in the kingdom. Frederick refused to acknowledge Alice as regent and sent Thomas of Acera to administer the kingdom on Conrad's behalf, but Acera could not land in the kingdom.

Jerusalem became a "sort of feudal republic" administered by the most powerful barons. Alice nonetheless exercised royal prerogatives. She annulled grants and appointments that Frederick had made after the death of Queen Isabella II. She granted a money-fief of 1,000 bezants to Philipp of Novara. Despite these exercises of royal power, she also stated before Marsilio Zorzi, who demanded the confirmation of the rights of the Venetian commune in Tyre, that she could not restore rights that had been withdrawn by a monarch because "she was not the lawful ruler of the kingdom". When Alice died in 1246, her son, Henry of Cyprus, succeeded her as regent of the Kingdom of Jerusalem.

References

Sources 

 
 
 
 
 
 
 

|-

House of Blois
Cypriot queens consort
Regents of Cyprus
Champagne, Alice of
13th-century people of the Kingdom of Jerusalem
13th-century women rulers
13th-century viceregal rulers
Remarried royal consorts
1193 births
1246 deaths
Year of birth uncertain
13th century in Cyprus
Women of the Crusader states
Daughters of kings
Queen mothers